Louis H. Folmer (April 15, 1904 – February 1983) was an American politician who served in the New York State Assembly from 1951 to 1968.

References

1904 births
1983 deaths
Republican Party members of the New York State Assembly
20th-century American politicians